Pennfield is a civil parish in Charlotte County, New Brunswick, Canada, located west of Saint John located east of St. George and west of Saint John. It comprises one village and two local service districts, all of which are members of the Southwest New Brunswick Service Commission (SNBSC).

The Census subdivision of the same name includes all of the parish except the village of Blacks Harbour.

Origin of name
The parish was named by Quaker Loyalist settlers of the area for William Penn, early Quaker leader and founder of Pennsylvania.

History
Pennfield was erected in 1786 as one of the county's original parishes; it included Lepreau Parish, the southern part of Clarendon Parish, and a small piece of Saint George Parish.

Boundaries
Pennfield Parish is bounded:

 on the north by a line running true west from the southernmost corner of Queens County;
 on the east by a line running true north from the mouth of the Pocologan River;
 on the west by the prolongation north and south of the western line of grants straddling Lake Utopia, then south along a line running through the Letang River and Letang Harbour;
 on the south by the Bay of Fundy.

Evolution of boundaries
Pennfield's original northern boundary was a prolongation of the southern line of the Cape Association grant in Saint David Parish, which runs south of Robinson Creek Road in Saint David Ridge. The prolongation passes near the northern end of Loon Lake in Clarendon Parish before striking the Queens County line. A small part of Saint George Parish near the head of the Letang River was also part of Pennfield; all islands in the river and Letang Harbour were part of Saint George.

In 1814 the parish was extended north to the county line, adding the rest of Clarendon.

In 1850 the boundary with Saint George Parish near the head of the Letang River was changed to its modern line.

In 1857 the eastern part of Pennfield was erected as LePreau Parish.

In 1868 all of the parish north of the most southern point of Queens County was included in the Clarendon District, a polling district that also included the northern part of Lepreau Parish.

In 1869 the northern part of Pennfield was included in the newly erected Clarendon Parish.

In 1877 the boundary through the Letang River and Letang Harbour was changed, transferring some islands to Pennfield.

Municipality
The village of Blacks Harbour sits at the southwestern corner of the parish's mainland.

Local service districts
Both LSDs assess for the basic LSD services of fire protection, police services, land use planning, emergency measures, and dog control.

Pennfield Parish
The local service district of the parish of Pennfield originally included all of the parish outside Blacks Harbour.

The LSD was established in 1970 to assess for fire protection. First aid and ambulance services were added in 1979.

Today the LSD additionally assesses for community & recreation services. The taxing authority is 512.00 Pennfield.

Beaver Harbour
Beaver Harbour comprises an area on the western side of Beaver Harbour, including the eastern part of the old town plat and running north to the junction of Mountain Road and Waite's Lane. The community of Beaver Harbour outgrew the boundaries of the LSD by 2013.

The LSD was established in 1971 to add street lighting and community services. First aid and ambulance services were added in 1979.

Today Beaver Harbour additionally assesses street lighting and community & recreation services. The taxing authority is 524.00 Beaver Harbour.

Beaver Harbour is the only LSD in Charlotte County with street lighting.

Communities
Communities at least partly within the parish. bold indicates an incorporated municipality

 Beaver Harbour
 Blacks Harbour
 Tunaville
 Crow Harbour
 Deadmans Harbour
 Justasons Corner
 Pennfield
 Pennfield Corner
 Pennfield Ridge
 Pennfield Station
 Seeleys Cove
 Utopia
 Utopia Centre
 Wallace Cove
 Woodland

Bodies of water
Bodies of water at least partly within the parish. italics indicate a name no longer in official use

 Letang River (L'Etang River)
 Little New River
 Little Pocologan River
 New River
 Pocologan River
 Cripps Stream
 Red Rock Stream
 Trout Lake Stream
 Buckmans Creek
 Crow Creek
 Wards Creek
 Beaver Harbour
 Blacks Harbour
 Crow Harbour
 Deadmans Harbour
 Letang Harbour (L'Etang Harbour)
 Red Head Harbour
 Seeleys Basin
 Eastern Chops
 The Basin
 more than fifty other officially named lakes

Islands
Islands at least partly within the parish. italics indicates a name no longer in official use

 Cochranes Island
 Moose Island (Little Moose Island)
 Munson Island
 Peat Island
 Penn Island
 Tub Island
 The Wolves
 Eastern Wolf Island
 Flat Wolf Island (Fatpot Island)
 Green Rock (Gull Rock)
 Horseshoe Rock
 Southern Wolf Island
 Spruce Island (Flat Wolf Island)

Other notable places
Parks, historic sites, and other noteworthy places at least partly within the parish.
 Lepreau River Wildlife Management Area
 New River Protected Natural Area
 Pocologan Protected Natural Area
 Utopia Wildlife Refuge

Demographics

Population

Language

Access Routes
Highways and numbered routes that run through the parish, including external routes that start or finish at the parish limits:

Highways

Principal Routes

Secondary Routes:

External Routes:
None

See also
List of parishes in New Brunswick

Notes

References

Parishes of Charlotte County, New Brunswick
Local service districts of Charlotte County, New Brunswick